Yoon Ji-hye (born November 10, 1979) is a South Korean actress. Yoon made her acting debut in the 1998 horror movie Whispering Corridors. She has since starred in films such as Possible Changes (2004), No Mercy for the Rude (2006), and Kundo: Age of the Rampant, as well as the television series Que Sera, Sera (2007).

Filmography

Film

Television series

Music video

Theater

Awards and nominations

References

External links
Yoon Ji-hye at C-JeS Entertainment 
Yoon Ji-hye Fan Cafe at Daum 

South Korean film actresses
South Korean television actresses
South Korean stage actresses
Seoul Institute of the Arts alumni
1979 births
Living people
20th-century South Korean actresses
21st-century South Korean actresses
South Korean Buddhists